Janis Antonovics FRS (born 1942 in Riga, Reichskommissariat Ostland) is an American biologist, and Lewis and Clark Professor of Biology, at University of Virginia.

Life
He was educated at Gravesend Grammar School (1953-1960), graduating from Clare College, Cambridge with a B.A. in 1963, and from University of Wales with a Ph.D. in 1966. 
He lectured at Institute for Advanced Study, Berlin.

Honors
He is a 1991 Guggenheim Fellow.
He was elected a Fellow of the Royal Society in 1988. He was elected to the American Academy of Arts and Sciences in 1992. He won the 1999 Sewall Wright Award.

Publications
Antonovics is the author or co-author of well over 150 scientific publications and book chapters from the 1960s until the 2020s. These include:
Antonovics, J. 2005. "Plant venereal diseases: insights from a messy metaphor". New Phytologist 165: 71–80.
Antonovics, J., Hood, M. E., and Baker, C. H. 2006. "Was the 1918 flu avian in origin?" Nature 440: E9
Antonovics, J., Abbate, J.L., Baker, C. H., Daley, D., Hood, M. E., Jenkins, C. E., Johnson, L. J., Murray, J. J., Panjeti, V., Volker H. W. Rudolf, V. W. H., Sloan, D., Vondrasek, J. 2007. "Evolution by any other name: antibiotic resistance and avoidance of the e-word". PLOS Biology 5: e30.
Rudolf, V., and Antonovics, J. 2007. "Disease transmission by cannibalism: rare event or common occurrence?" Proceedings of the Royal Society of London, Series B 274:1205-10 
J Antonovics, AD Bradshaw, RG Turner (1971) Heavy metal tolerance in plants. Advances in ecological research 7 1-85

References

External links
Antonovics Lab Website

1942 births
21st-century American biologists
Fellows of the Royal Society
Living people
Soviet emigrants to the United Kingdom
Latvian World War II refugees
People educated at Gravesend Grammar School
Alumni of Clare College, Cambridge
Alumni of the University of Wales
University of Virginia faculty
British emigrants to the United States